"Long Cool Woman in a Black Dress" (also titled "Long Cool Woman" or "Long Cool Woman (in a Black Dress)") is a song written by Allan Clarke, Roger Cook and Roger Greenaway, and performed by the British rock group the Hollies. Originally appearing on the album Distant Light, it was released as a single on 17 April 1972 (on Parlophone in the United Kingdom), selling 2 million copies worldwide, including 1.5 million in the United States. It reached No. 2 on the Billboard Hot 100 in September 1972 for two weeks, behind Gilbert O'Sullivan's "Alone Again (Naturally)". Billboard ranked it as the No. 24 song for 1972.

Background and recording
On the day "Long Cool Woman" was recorded at AIR Studios, the group's producer, Ron Richards, was ill and, as a result, the song was produced by the group. The song is different from most other Hollies songs in that there are no three-part vocal harmonies, and that it features lead guitar as well as lead vocal work by Allan Clarke. Upon his return, Richards mixed the recording.

The song was written initially in the country/rockabilly style of Jerry Reed then adapted over recording more to the swamp rock style of Creedence Clearwater Revival, in terms of the vocal, rhythm, and melodic style. Clarke imitated John Fogerty's vocal style, which was based on the Creedence song "Green River". According to Clarke, the song was written "in about five minutes".

Reception
U.S. music-business magazine Cash Box said of the song: "rockin' in the tradition of Creedence and T Rex, the Hollies at their most commercial since 'He Ain't Heavy.'" The similarity to Creedence Clearwater Revival was not lost on that group's lead singer, John Fogerty. He was of the opinion that the song was "too close" to his trademark sound, and sued the Hollies over the issue. The suit was settled out of court for an undisclosed sum of money.

In the Hollies' native United Kingdom, the song was only a modest success, peaking at number 32 on the charts. However, it was a hit in the United States, peaking at number 2 for two weeks, making it the group's highest-charting single ever in the U.S. It topped the charts in South Africa, and also reached number 2 in Australia and New Zealand. By that time Clarke had left the band, but he feels that "it wasn't unfortunate", for he had co-written the song. Clarke rejoined the Hollies in the summer of 1973, partly due to the success of the song.

Track listing

Personnel
 Allan Clarke – vocals, lead guitar
 Tony Hicks and Terry Sylvester – guitar
 Bernie Calvert – bass
 Bobby Elliott – drums

Chart performance

Weekly singles charts

Year-end charts

In popular culture and cover versions
Phantom, Rocker & Slick released their version on their 1986 album Cover Girl.
 "Long Cool Woman in a Black Dress" was the first song played by the band Phish. They also played the song at their 15th and 20th anniversary concerts.
A cappella group Rockapella released a version on their 1995 album Primer. Their version often accompanied the map round on Where in the World is Carmen Sandiego.
Country music singer T. G. Sheppard covered the song on his 1997 album Nothin' on But the Radio.
 The song was used in the films Remember the Titans, Amores Perros, The Longest Yard, The Lovely Bones, Trouble with the Curve, Teenage Mutant Ninja Turtles: Out of the Shadows, Kong: Skull Island, and Air America.
Country music singer Clint Black released his version of the song to country radio on 19 February 2008, under the title "Long Cool Woman".  Black's version charted on the Hot Country Songs chart at #58.
Heavy metal rocker Vince Neil released a heavier version of "Long Cool Woman", along with other covers and original material, on his third studio album, Tattoos & Tequila, on 22 June 2010.

References

1972 singles
1997 singles
2008 singles
The Hollies songs
T. G. Sheppard songs
Clint Black songs
Parlophone singles
Epic Records singles
Songs written by Roger Greenaway
Songs written by Roger Cook (songwriter)
Songs written by Allan Clarke (singer)
1971 songs
Cashbox number-one singles
RPM Top Singles number-one singles
Number-one singles in South Africa
Works subject to a lawsuit